Tomasina Morosini (c. 1250 in Venice – 1300 in Óbuda), Duchess of Slavonia, was a member of the prominent Venetian Morosini family. Her son was Andrew III, the Venetian King of Hungary.

Life
She was the daughter of Michele Sbarra Morosini, Patrician of Venice. Her brother was Albertino Morosini.

In 1263 she married Stephen the Posthumous, Prince of Hungary in Venice where he was living in exile. His paternity was disputed by his brothers born from their father's earlier marriage and he was not recognized as  heir presumptive to the Hungarian throne. Tomasina gave birth to a son, Andrew III, King of Hungary (ruled 1290-1301), who was named after his grandfather, Andrew II.

She supported her son's claim to the Hungarian throne. After the death of King Ladislaus IV, Prince Andrew succeeded to gain the kingdom and he was crowned King of Hungary in the name of Andrew III in 1290. He summoned his mother to Hungary and appointed her Princess of Slavonia.

Allegedly she was poisoned in 1300, shortly before her son's death on 14 January 1301 which was also rumoured to have been caused by poisoning. He was the last king of the House of Árpád.

External links

13th-century births
1300 deaths
Tomasina
House of Árpád
13th-century Venetian women
Duchesses of Slavonia